The El Paso Coyotes were an American professional indoor soccer franchise based in El Paso, Texas. Founded in June 2016, the team made its debut in the Major Arena Soccer League with the 2016–17 season. The team's final season was 2018-19.

Personnel
As of March 26, 2019.

Active players

Inactive players

Staff
Jose Luis Trevino – Head Coach
Jesus Enriquez – Assistant Coach
Arnoldo Ceniseros – Assistant Coach
Miguel Felix  – Medical Assistant
Gustavo Sierra  – Physical Trainer
Joshua Ashliman - Trainer

References

External links 
 

Association football clubs established in 2016
Indoor soccer clubs in the United States
Soccer clubs in Texas
Major Arena Soccer League teams
Sports in El Paso, Texas
2016 establishments in Texas